The Nusplingen Limestone (German: Nusplingen Plattenkalk) is a geological formation in Baden-Württemberg, Germany. It preserves fossils dating to the Kimmeridgian age of the Late Jurassic. It mainly consists of lithographic limestones deposited in a marine basin, similar to the Solnhofen Limestone. Fossils of pterosaurs, thalattosuchians, and the oldest geophilomorph centipede Eogeophilus were found in the Nusplingen Limestone.

History 

The Nusplingen Limestone was first discovered in the first half of the 19th century. In 1839, Friedrich Kinzelbach, a doctor working in Nusplingen, led Friedrich August von Quenstedt to a quarry a farmer used to retrieve floor tiles. Friedrich Kinzelbach presumably led Quenstedt to the locality after hearing his talks about the Solnhofen Limestone. Quenstedt recognized the Importance of the locality, commenting on how fossil-rich the locality is, mentioning numerous fossils of Lumbricaria and numerous fish scales. In 1839, Quenstedt introduced the term "Nusplinger Plattenkalk" (Nusplingen Limestone) for the quarry's limestone. Quenstedt's writing about the locality resulted in the collection of fossil material by the bishop Oskar Fraas. In 1849, he held a essay on the Nusplingen Limestone at the meeting of German naturalists and doctors in Regensburg. Later, in 1850, Count Wilhelm von Württemberg gave a lecture on the concept of sourcing lithography stones from Nusplingen. Oskar Fraas motivated the businessman Christian Fuchs from Stuttgart to start sourcing rock from Nusplingen in 1853, and the first big quarry was created after that. Unfortunately the limestone from Nusplingen was not usable for lithography, but the fossil collection of Oskar Fraas had grown immensely, and Quenstedt also began collecting fossils from the site. Friedrich Eser, who also collected fossils from Nusplingen, called the site a "paternal Solnhofen". In the year 1855, the first pterosaur remains were found, specimens of Rhamphorhynchus and Cycnorhamphus.

In 1896, fossil and mineral dealer Bernhard Stürtz began quarry work in the Nusplingen Limestone once again. This time fossils were the only focus of the quarry workers. The found fossils were offered for sale to the University of Tübingen and the Royal Natural Cabinet in Stuttgart. Only 30 years after the dig by Stürtz did a excavation with a scientific focus begin, when in 1929 the University of Tübingen began quarry work from a purely scientific view. This short campaign was very successful, bringing forth a fossil of the large chimaera Ischyodus, and the first research on how the deposit was formed. However, the campaign quickly ran out of funding and came to an end. Work began again in 1935 under Alfred Mayer-Gürr, who was then subsequently replaced by Bruno Fuchs after Alfred left to work in Iraq. Due to World War 2, a detailed overview of this campaign never came to be.

The original owner of the quarry passed away, and multiple companies tried to buy it for building material. It was then sold to the Verein für vaterländische Naturkunde in Württemberg in an effort to protect the locality, which was subsequently put under conservation. In 1946 the University of Paris led a campaign, though what happened to the fossils found in this campaign is unknown. It took 14 years for the next campaign to start in 1962, undertaken by the University of Tübingen; this campaign was treated as unsuccessful and was stopped after a few months.

In the year 1980, new information came to light on the extent of the Nusplingen Limestone. In Egesheim, a new quarry exposing rocks of the Nusplingen Limestone was established only 250 meters away from the previous site. Afraid the fossils would get destroyed by the quarry work, the Natural History Museum of Stuttgart requested the whole extent of the Nusplingen Limestone to be put under protection, which was then accepted on 25 November 1983. Afraid of fossil thieves, sample digs were started by the SMNH to determine how threatened the fossil richness of the fossil site was. With the subsequent find of a complete shark skeleton of the genus Sphenodus, the museum invested in a research campaign which started in 1994 in the old Nusplingen quarry, and in 1993 in the Egesheimer quarry. The campaign has yet to stop.

Dating 
Lithographic limestones are a common occurrence throughout the Late Jurassic, which is why many geologists used to believe that they were deposited at the same time. Friedrich August von Quenstedt defined these together with deposits in the Swabian Alps as "Weißjura zeta". Nowadays Ammonite-Zones are used to date these deposits more clearly. Analysis of the ammonite fauna has now shown that the Nusplingen Limestone is around 0.5 million years older than the Solnhofen Limestone, which makes it late Kimmeridgian in age.

Paleobiota 
The Nusplingen Limestone has yielded a rich variety of fossil material, including plants, decapod crustaceans, Insects, fish, cephalopods and pterosaurs, as well as an isolated feather of a dinosaur.

Source is  unless mnetioned otherwise.

Porifera

Anthozoa

Mollusca

Lamellibranchiata

Gastropoda

Ammonoidea

Nautiloidea

Belemnoidea

Other Cephalopods

Polychaetes

Insecta 
Multiple unnamed beetles and a crane fly are known from the Locality

Chilopoda

Limulidae

Crustaceans

Natantia

Reptantia

Mysidacea

Other Crustaceans

Tylacocephala

Brachiopoda

Echinodermata

Echinoidea

See also 
 List of fossiliferous stratigraphic units in Germany

References

Further reading 
 R. Böttcher and C. J. Duffin. 2000. The neoselachian shark Sphenodus from the Late Kimmeridgian (Late Jurassic) of Nusplingen and Egesheim (Baden-Württemberg, Germany). Stuttgarter Beiträge zur Naturkunde B, Geologie und Paläontologie 283:1–31
 O. Dietl and G. Schweigert. 2000. Brachiopoden aus dem Nusplinger Plattenkalk (Oberjura, SW Deutschland). Stuttgarter Beiträge zur Naturkunde. Serie B (Geologie und Paläontologie) 290:1–23
 P. Zügel, W. Riegraf, G. Schweigert and G. Dietl. 1998. Radiolaria from the Nusplingen Lithographic Limestone (Late Kimmeridgian, SW Germany). Stuttgarter Beiträge zur Naturkunde, Serie B (Geologie und Paläontologie) 268:43
 G. Schweigert and G. Dietl. 1997. Ein fossiler Hundertfüßler (Chilopoda, Geophilida) aus dem Nusplinger Plattenkalk (Oberjura, Südwestdeutschland). Stuttgarter Beiträge zur Naturkunde, Serie B (Geologie und Paläontologie) 254:1–11
 G. Schweigert, G. Dietl, M. Kapitzke, J. Rieter, and R. Hugger. 1996. Libellen aus dem Nusplinger Plattenkalk (Oberjura, Ober-Kimmeridgium, Württemberg). Stuttgarter Beiträge zur Naturkunde, Serie B (Geologie und Paläontologie) 236:1–12

Geologic formations of Germany
Jurassic System of Europe
Jurassic Germany
Kimmeridgian Stage
Limestone formations
Lagoonal deposits
Shallow marine deposits
Fossiliferous stratigraphic units of Europe
Paleontology in Germany
Formations